The 2000-01 season was the 44th season in RK Zamet’s history. It is their 9th successive season in the 1. A HRL, and 24th successive top tier season.

First team squad

Goalkeeper
1  Ivan Stevanović
12   Mario Perčin
16  Igor Saršon
20   Vedran Šimunović

Wingers
RW
 2  Mario Jozak
 11  Igor Rožman

LW
 4  Mateo Hrvatin
 6  Eduard Hibšer
 10   Bojan Pezelj

Line players
3  Renato Sulić
 11  Mirjan Horvat
 19  Adnan Kamberović

Back players
LB
10  Andrej Jurić
14  Tomislav Matošević
15  Borna Franić (captain)

CB
8  Igor Gmaz
 13  Edin Bašić
 17  Siniša Gaković
 18  Ivica Grga

RB
 5  Davor Šunjić
 7  Milan Uzelac 
 9  Ivan Vukas

Technical staff 
  President: Marko Markanović
  Sports director: Boris Konjuh
  Club Secretary: Senka Glušević
  Head Coach: Damir Čavlović 
  Fitness Coach: Sergio DePrivitellio 
  Fizioterapist: Alen Ilić
  Tehniko: Goran Segarić

Competitions

Overall

EHF Cup Winners' Cup

Matches

1.A HRL

League table

Matches

Championship play-offs

Croatian Cup

Matches

External links
HRS
Sport.net.hr
Rk-zamet.hr

References

RK Zamet seasons
Handball in Croatia